Sean Keith is a drummer, singer, songwriter, guitarist, and pastor at Lifegate Church in Omaha, Nebraska. His style has been compared to Chris Tomlin, Paul Baloche, Hillsong United, Gateway Worship, and Aaron Shust.

Discography
Control (2003)
Back to You (2006)
Dare to Imagine (2009)
Brand New Day (2010)
Your Victory Remains (2012)

See also
Farmer Not So John

References

Musicians from Omaha, Nebraska
Year of birth missing (living people)
Living people